KCNN (97.7 FM) is a country music formatted broadcast radio station licensed to Benson, Arizona, serving western Cochise County and eastern Pima County. KCNN is owned and operated by Tom Troland, through licensee Redrock Media Group LLC.

History
A construction permit for a new radio station in Benson was issued in December 1977, with the callsign being awarded in 1979. After several time extensions, KAVV came to air in April 1983.

Owner Paul Lotsof would collapse in the station's production room and soon after be reported as dead on August 27, 2022; his estate would then begin the process of selling the stations in his Stereo 97, Inc. company, including KAVV, which would be sold to Redrock Media Group LLC for $200,000, with the sale being reported September 9, just two weeks after Lotsof's death. The sale would close three months later on December 14; upon Redrock Media Group taking over, the company would dismiss the entirety of the then-current airstaff and relaunch the station, shifting from a classic country format to one with more modern country music, rebranding as "Canyon Country 97.7" under new callsign KCNN. The Federal Communications Commission issued the call sign change effective January 26, 2023.

References

External links
Canyon Country 97.7 FM Online

CNN
Radio stations established in 1985
1985 establishments in Arizona
Country radio stations in the United States
Mass media in Cochise County, Arizona